I'll Make You Music is the only album by Beverly Bremers and was released in 1972. It reached #124 on the Billboard Top 200 chart.

The album featured three singles: "Don't Say You Don't Remember", which reached #15 on the Billboard Hot 100, "We're Free", which reached #40, and "I'll Make You Music", which reached #63.

Track listing
 "I'll Make You Music" (Bruce Roberts) – 3:02
 "I Made a Man Out of You, Jimmy" (Doc Pomus/Ken Hirsch) - 2:40
 "A Guy Like You" (Eddie Brigati/Felix Cavaliere) - 3:15
 "All That's Left Is the Music" (Roberts) - 2:52
 "Colors of Love" (Mark Barkan/Norman Bergen) - 2:18
 "We're Free" (Irwin Levine/L. Russell Brown) - 3:06
 "Don't Say You Don't Remember" (Estelle Levitt/Helen Miller) - 3:24
 "At My Place" (Vicki Gellman/Wendy Gell) – 2:44
 "Poor Side of Town" (Johnny Rivers/Lou Adler) – 2:47
 "Baby I Don't Know You" (Sandy Linzer/Steve Reinhardt) – 2:57
 "Get Smart Girl" (Reinhardt) – 2:55
 "May the Road Rise to Meet You" (Levine/Brown) – 3:09

Personnel
David Lipton – producer (tracks: 1–11)
 Steve Metz  – producer (tracks: 1–11)
 Irwin Levine – producer (track: 12)
 L. Russell Brown – producer (track: 12)
Mickey Eichner – producer (track: 12)
Beverly Bremers – lead vocals
 Don Thomas – guitar
Joe Mack – bass
Norman Bergen – keyboards, arrangements

Charts

Singles

References

1972 debut albums
Scepter Records albums